Geraldine Waruguru is a Kenyan businesswoman and airline pilot. She is the founder, co-owner and chief executive officer of Scents by Geraldine Limited, a perfume manufacturing business, based in Nairobi. She concurrently works as an airline transport pilot, who serves as a First Officer at Kenya Airways, Kenya's national carrier airline, on the Boeing 737 aircraft.

Background and education
Waruguru was born in Kenya circa 1984. She attended Kenyan schools for her elementary and secondary education. She then went on to obtain a commercial pilot licence from the 43rd Air School, in Port Alfred, South Africa. Later in 2016, she undertook a course in perfumery.

Career
Geraldine Waruguru began flying for Kenya Airways in 2006. After several years of research, she decided to start her own perfume line in 2016. After looking for a manufacturing partner in Germany, South Africa and the United Kingdom, she selected Scentury Company from Berlin.

Her first branded perfume came to market in 2017, after Geraldine spent €25,000 of her personal savings on developing the brand. She markets her fragrances online and on social media platforms. She also maintains a shop along Kenyatta Avenue, in Nairobi's central business district. During the COVID-19 pandemic, instead of laying off her staff, she convinced them to accept half of their regular salary.

Family
Geraldine Waruguru is a mother to a son, who was born circa 2013.

Other considerations
Prior to the outbreak of the COVID-19 pandemic, she expected to complete her examinations to become a captain on the Boeing 737 by the end of 2020.

See also
 Irene Koki Mutungi
 Vanita Kayiwa
 Esther Mbabazi

References

Living people
1984 births
Kenyan aviators
21st-century Kenyan businesswomen
21st-century Kenyan businesspeople
Kenyan chief executives
Nairobi
Commercial aviators
Women commercial aviators